Dangwa is a Philippine television drama romance fantasy series broadcast by GMA Network. Directed by Adolf Alix Jr., it stars Janine Gutierrez. It premiered on October 26, 2015 on the network's morning line up. The series concluded on January 29, 2016 with a total of 70 episodes. It was replaced by Carmina in its timeslot.

The series is streaming online on YouTube.

Cast and characters

Lead cast
 Janine Gutierrez as Maria Rosa Capulong

Supporting cast
 Mark Herras as Sebastian "Baste" Espinoza
 Aljur Abrenica as Lorenzo "Renz" Arguente

Recurring cast
 Jackie Lou Blanco as Veronica Arguente
 Rey "PJ" Abellana as Carlos Guinto
 Stephanie Sol as Dianne
 Arianne Bautista as Nana
 Lance Serrano as Jake
 Bryan Benedict as Rene
 Dan Alvaro as Erning
 Antonette Garcia as Miriam Urdaneta
 Mailes Kanapi as Ada
 Gigi Locsin as Fe Manlupe
 James Alfred Cruz as Caloy
 Rolando Inocencio as Father Manalo
 Carmelo Gutierrez as Kapitan
 Cesar Batitis as Wally

Guest cast
 Martin del Rosario as Miguel
 Ash Ortega as Wendy Selene Schmitt
 Ruru Madrid as Carl
 Barbie Forteza as Mary
 Thea Tolentino as Faye
 Andre Paras as Roger
 Rhian Ramos as Sheryl "She" Cruz
 Geoff Eigenmann as Mike
 Betong Sumaya as Donya
 Maey Bautista as Rica
 Megan Young as Jane Imperial
 Mikael Daez as Jericho Santillan
 Arny Ross as Fiona
 Carla Abellana as Julia
 Rafael Rosell as Leo
 Pauleen Luna as Jenny
 Fabio Ide as Brian
 Jerald Napoles as Tonio
 Ervic Vijandre as Christian
 Louise delos Reyes as Toni Katigbak
 Derrick Monasterio as Graham Bell
 Rodjun Cruz as Ethan
 Matet de Leon as Mercy Katigbak
 Bianca Umali as Lia De Guzman
 Miguel Tanfelix as Josh
 Glaiza de Castro as Ella and Emma
 Boy2 Quizon as Joey
 Roxee B as Venus
 Ayra Mariano as Mary Rose Capulong
 Boobay as Jaja

Ratings
According to AGB Nielsen Philippines' Mega Manila household television ratings, the pilot episode of Dangwa earned a 16.3% rating. While the final episode scored an 8.9% rating.

References

External links
 
 

2015 Philippine television series debuts
2016 Philippine television series endings
Filipino-language television shows
GMA Network drama series
GMA Integrated News and Public Affairs shows
Philippine romance television series
Television shows set in Manila